Aleksandr Valeryevich Khokhlov (born 30 September 1988) is a former Russian football player.

Club career
He made his debut in the Russian Premier League on 30 May 2009 in a game against FC Zenit St. Petersburg.

He played 1 game for FC Zenit St. Petersburg in the Russian Cup.

External links

References

1988 births
Living people
Russian footballers
FC Zenit Saint Petersburg players
FC Kuban Krasnodar players
Russian Premier League players
PFC Spartak Nalchik players
FC Rostov players
FC Saturn Ramenskoye players

Association football defenders